"Break the Silence" is a single by Danish singer Thomas Ring Petersen, from his debut studio album Wrong Side of the Daylight (2011). It was released on 8 February 2011 as a digital download in Denmark. The song peaked to number 4 on the Danish Singles Chart.

Track listing

Chart performance

Release history

References

2011 singles
2011 songs
RCA Records singles